Kosmos 49 ( meaning Cosmos 49), also known as DS-MG No.2 was a scientific satellite which was launched by the Soviet Union in 1964. This mission used proton magnetometers to map the Earth's magnetic field and, along with Kosmos 26, represented the USSR's contribution to the International Quiet Solar Year World Magnetic Survey. The corresponding American measurements were performed by the satellites OGO 2 and OGO 4. It also conducted scientific research into the Earth's infrared flux and ultraviolet flux.

It had a mass of 400 kg. The performance of the spacecraft was satisfactory.

It was launched aboard a Kosmos-2I 63S1 rocket from Mayak-2 at Kapustin Yar. The launch occurred at 05:17 GMT on 24 October 1964. It decayed from orbit on 21 August 1965. Kosmos 49 was the second of two DS-MG satellites to be launched, the other being Kosmos 26.

See also

 1964 in spaceflight

References

Spacecraft launched in 1964
Kosmos 0049
1964 in the Soviet Union
Dnepropetrovsk Sputnik program